was a castle in Ōmihachiman, Japan, on the eastern shore of Lake Biwa in Shiga prefecture. It was the home castle of Toyotomi Hidetsugu, the nephew of Toyotomi Hideyoshi.

History
Hachimanyama Castle was built by Toyotomi Hidetsugu in 1585 under orders from Toyotomi Hideyoshi. Azuchi Castle's materials were used in the construction of the castle, and Azuchi city's functions were moved to Hachiman city. In 1595, Kyōgoku Takatsugu moved to Ōtsu Castle and Hachimanyama Castle was abandoned.

Current state
Hachimanyama castle is now in ruins, with some extant stone walls and wet moat. The Buddhist temple Zuiryuji now occupies the former honmaru, or main bailey. Hachimanyama Ropeway provides services between the mountaintop and Himure Hachimangū.　 The castle was listed as one of the Continued Top 100 Japanese Castles in 2017.

Gallery

Literature

References

Castles in Shiga Prefecture
Historic Sites of Japan
Former castles in Japan
Ruined castles in Japan
Toyotomi clan
Ōmihachiman, Shiga